The 1941 All-Ireland Junior Hurling Championship was the 24th staging of the All-Ireland Junior Championship since its establishment by the Gaelic Athletic Association in 1912.

Cork entered the championship as the defending champions, however, they were beaten by Limerick in the Munster semi-final.

The All-Ireland final was played on 21 September 1941  at Cusack Park in Ennis, between Limerick and Galway, in what was their first ever meeting in a final. Limerick won the match by 8-02 to 4-01 to claim their first ever championship title.

Results

All-Ireland Junior Hurling Championship

All-Ireland semi-final

All-Ireland final

References

Junior
All-Ireland Junior Hurling Championship